Christopher Eric Hitchens (13 April 1949 – 15 December 2011) was a British-American author and journalist who wrote or edited over 30 books on culture, politics, and literature. Born and educated in England, Hitchens worked as a journalist with the New Statesman magazine in London in the 1970s after completing his education at Oxford. In the early 1980s, he emigrated to the United States and wrote for The Nation and Vanity Fair.

Hitchens's political views evolved greatly throughout his life. Originally describing himself as a democratic socialist, he was a member of various socialist organisations in his early life, including the International Socialists. He was critical of aspects of American foreign policy, including its involvement in Vietnam, Chile, and East Timor. However, he also supported the United States in the Kosovo War. Hitchens has emphasized the centrality of the American Revolution and Constitution to his political philosophy. Hitchens held complex views on abortion; being ethically opposed to it in most instances, and believing that a fetus was entitled to personhood, while holding ambiguous, changing views on its legality. He supported gun rights and LGBT rights while opposing the War on Drugs. Beginning in the 1990s, and particularly after 9/11, his politics were widely viewed as drifting to the right, but Hitchens objected to being called conservative. During the 2000s, he argued for the invasions of Iraq and Afghanistan, endorsed the re-election campaign of George W. Bush in 2004, and viewed Islamism as the principal threat to the Western World.

Hitchens described himself as an anti-theist and saw all religions as false, harmful and authoritarian. He argued for free expression, scientific discovery, and the separation of church and state, arguing that they were superior to religion as an ethical code of conduct for human civilisation. The dictum "What can be asserted without evidence can also be dismissed without evidence" has become known as Hitchens' razor. Hitchens notably wrote critical biographies of Catholic nun Mother Teresa in The Missionary Position, President Bill Clinton in No One Left To Lie To, and American diplomat Henry Kissinger in The Trial of Henry Kissinger.

Hitchens died from complications related to oesophageal cancer in December 2011, at the age of 62.

Life and Career

Early life and education
Hitchens was born in Portsmouth, Hampshire, the elder of two boys; his brother, Peter, became a socially conservative journalist. Their parents, Eric Ernest Hitchens (1909–1987) and Yvonne Jean Hitchens (née Hickman; 1921–1973), met in Scotland when serving in the Royal Navy during World War II. His mother had been a Wren, a member of the Women's Royal Naval Service. She was of Jewish origin (Christopher and his brother were 1/32 ethnically Jewish), something Hitchens discovered when he was 38; he came to identify as a Jew.

Hitchens often referred to Eric simply as 'the commander'. He paid tribute to his father's contribution to the war: "Sending a Nazi convoy raider to the bottom is a better day's work than any I have ever done." Eric's naval career required the family to move from base to base throughout Britain and its colonies, including to Malta, where Peter Hitchens was born in Sliema in 1951. Eric later worked as a bookkeeper for boatbuilders, speedboat-manufacturers, and a prep school.

Hitchens attended two independent schools—Mount House School, Tavistock, Devon, from the age of eight, and the Leys School in Cambridge. Hitchens was admitted to Balliol College, Oxford in 1967 where he read Philosophy, Politics and Economics and was tutored by Steven Lukes and Anthony Kenny. He graduated in 1970 with a third-class degree. In his adolescence, he was "bowled over" by Richard Llewellyn's How Green Was My Valley, Arthur Koestler's Darkness at Noon, Fyodor Dostoyevsky's Crime and Punishment, R. H. Tawney's critique on Religion and the Rise of Capitalism, and the works of George Orwell. In 1968, he took part in the TV quiz show University Challenge.

In the 1960s Hitchens joined the political left, drawn by disagreement over the Vietnam War, nuclear weapons, racism and oligarchy, including that of "the unaccountable corporation". He expressed affinity with the politically charged countercultural and protest movements of the 1960s and 1970s. He avoided the recreational drug use of the time, saying "in my cohort we were slightly anti-hedonistic ... it made it very much easier for police provocation to occur, because the planting of drugs was something that happened to almost everyone one knew." Hitchens was inspired to become a journalist after reading a piece by James Cameron.

Hitchens was bisexual during his younger days, and joked that as he aged, his appearance "declined to the point where only women would go to bed with [him]." He said he had sexual relations with two male students at Oxford who would later become Tory ministers during the premiership of Margaret Thatcher, although he would not reveal their names publicly.

Hitchens joined the Labour Party in 1965, but along with the majority of the Labour students' organisation was expelled in 1967, because of what Hitchens called "Prime Minister Harold Wilson's contemptible support for the war in Vietnam." Under the influence of Peter Sedgwick, who translated the writings of Russian revolutionary and Soviet dissident Victor Serge, Hitchens forged an ideological interest in Trotskyism and anti-Stalinist socialism. Shortly after, he joined "a small but growing post-Trotskyist Luxemburgist sect".

Journalistic career in the UK (1971–1981)
Early in his career Hitchens began working as a correspondent for the magazine International Socialism, published by the International Socialists, the forerunners of today's British Socialist Workers Party. This group was broadly Trotskyist, but differed from more orthodox Trotskyist groups in its refusal to defend communist states as "workers' states". Their slogan was "Neither Washington nor Moscow but International Socialism".

In 1971 after spending a year travelling the United States on a scholarship, Hitchens went to work at the Times Higher Education Supplement where he served as a social science correspondent. Hitchens was fired after six months in the job. Next he was a researcher for ITV's Weekend World.

In 1973 Hitchens went to work for the New Statesman, where his colleagues included the authors Martin Amis, whom he had briefly met at Oxford, as well as Julian Barnes and James Fenton, with whom he had shared a house in Oxford. Amis described him at the time as, "handsome, festive [and] gauntly left-wing". Around that time, the Friday lunches began, which were attended by writers including Clive James, Ian McEwan, Kingsley Amis, Terence Kilmartin, Robert Conquest, Al Alvarez, Peter Porter, Russell Davies and Mark Boxer. At the New Statesman Hitchens acquired a reputation as a left-winger while working as a war correspondent from areas of conflict such as Northern Ireland, Libya, and Iraq.

In November 1973, while in Greece, Hitchens reported on the constitutional crisis of the military junta. It became his first leading article for the New Statesman. In December 1977 Hitchens interviewed Argentine dictator Jorge Rafael Videla, a conversation he later described as "horrifying". In 1977, unhappy at the New Statesman, Hitchens defected to the Daily Express where he became a foreign correspondent. He returned to the New Statesman in 1978 where he became assistant editor and then foreign editor.

American writings (1981–2011)

Hitchens went to the United States in 1981 as part of an editor exchange programme between the New Statesman and The Nation. After joining The Nation, he penned vociferous critiques of Ronald Reagan, George H. W. Bush and American foreign policy in South and Central America.

Hitchens became a contributing editor of Vanity Fair in 1992, writing ten columns a year. He left The Nation in 2002 after profoundly disagreeing with other contributors over the Iraq War.

There is speculation that Hitchens was the inspiration for Tom Wolfe's character Peter Fallow in the 1987 novel The Bonfire of the Vanities, but others—including Hitchens—believe it to be Spy Magazines "Ironman Nightlife Decathlete", Anthony Haden-Guest. In 1987, Hitchens's father died from cancer of the oesophagus, the same disease that would later claim his own life. In April 2007, Hitchens became a US citizen; he later stated that he saw himself as Anglo-American.

He became a media fellow at the Hoover Institution in September 2008. At Slate, he usually wrote under the news-and-politics column Fighting Words.

Hitchens spent part of his early career in journalism as a foreign correspondent in Cyprus. Through his work there he met his first wife Eleni Meleagrou, a Greek Cypriot, with whom he had two children, Alexander and Sophia. His son, Alexander Meleagrou-Hitchens, born in 1984, has worked as a policy researcher in London. Hitchens continued writing essay-style correspondence pieces from a variety of locales, including Chad, Uganda and the Darfur region of Sudan. In 1991, he received a Lannan Literary Award for Nonfiction.

Hitchens met Carol Blue in Los Angeles in 1989 and they married in 1991. Hitchens called it love at first sight. In 1999, Hitchens and Blue, both harsh critics of President Clinton, submitted an affidavit to the trial managers of the Republican Party in the impeachment of Bill Clinton. Therein they swore that their then friend Sidney Blumenthal had described Monica Lewinsky as a stalker. This allegation contradicted Blumenthal's own sworn deposition in the trial, and it resulted in a hostile exchange of opinion in the public sphere between Hitchens and Blumenthal. Following the publication of Blumenthal's The Clinton Wars, Hitchens wrote several pieces in which he accused Blumenthal of manipulating the facts. The incident ended their friendship and sparked a personal crisis for Hitchens, who was stridently criticised by friends for what they saw as a cynical and ultimately politically futile act.

Before Hitchens's political shift, the American author and polemicist Gore Vidal was apt to speak of Hitchens as his "dauphin" or "heir". In 2010 Hitchens attacked Vidal in a Vanity Fair piece headlined "Vidal Loco", calling him a "crackpot" for his adoption of 9/11 conspiracy theories. On the back of Hitchens's memoir Hitch-22, among the praise from notable figures, Vidal's endorsement of Hitchens as his successor is crossed out in red and annotated "NO, C.H." Hitchens's strong advocacy of the war in Iraq gained him a wider readership, and in September 2005 he was named as fifth on the list of the "Top 100 Public Intellectuals" by Foreign Policy and Prospect magazines. An online poll ranked the 100 intellectuals, but the magazines noted that the rankings of Hitchens (5), Noam Chomsky (1), and Abdolkarim Soroush (15) were partly due to their respective supporters' publicising of the vote. Hitchens later responded to his ranking with a few articles about his status as such.

Hitchens did not leave his position writing for The Nation until after the 11 September attacks, stating that he felt the magazine had arrived at a position "that John Ashcroft is a greater menace than Osama bin Laden". The 11 September attacks "exhilarated" him, bringing into focus "a battle between everything I love and everything I hate" and strengthening his embrace of an interventionist foreign policy that challenged "fascism with an Islamic face." His numerous editorials in support of the Iraq War caused some to label him a neoconservative, although Hitchens insisted he was not "a conservative of any kind", and his friend Ian McEwan described him as representing the anti-totalitarian left. Hitchens recalls in his memoir having been "invited by Bernard-Henri Lévy to write an essay on political reconsiderations for his magazine La Regle du Jeu. I gave it the partly ironic title: 'Can One Be a Neoconservative?' Impatient with this, some copy editor put it on the cover as 'How I Became a Neoconservative.' Perhaps this was an instance of the Cartesian principle as opposed to the English empiricist one: It was decided that I evidently was what I apparently only thought." Indeed, in a 2010 BBC interview, he stated that he "still [thought] like a Marxist" and considered himself "a leftist."

In 2007, Hitchens published one of his most controversial articles entitled "Why Women Aren't Funny" in Vanity Fair. Relying mainly on empirical evidence, he argued that there is less societal pressure for women to practice humour and that "women who do it play by men's rules". Over the following year, Vanity Fair published several letters that it received, objecting to the tone or premise of the article, as well as a rebuttal by Alessandra Stanley. Amid further criticism, Hitchens reiterated his position in a video and written response.

In 2007 Hitchens's work for Vanity Fair won the National Magazine Award in the category "Columns and Commentary".
He was a finalist in the same category in 2008 for some of his columns in Slate but lost out to Matt Taibbi of Rolling Stone. Hitch-22 was short-listed for the 2010 National Book Critics Circle Award for Autobiography. He won the National Magazine Award for Columns about Cancer in 2011. Hitchens also served on the advisory board of Secular Coalition for America and offered advice to the Coalition on the acceptance and inclusion of nontheism in American life. In December 2011, prior to his death, Asteroid 57901 Hitchens was named after him.

Literature reviews
Hitchens wrote a monthly essay in The Atlantic and occasionally contributed to other literary journals. One of his books, Unacknowledged Legislation: Writers in the Public Sphere, collected these works. In Why Orwell Matters, he defends Orwell's writings against modern critics as relevant today and progressive for his time. In the 2008 book Christopher Hitchens and His Critics: Terror, Iraq, and the Left, many literary critiques are included of essays and other books of writers, such as David Horowitz and Edward Said.

During a three-hour In Depth interview on Book TV, he named authors who influenced his views, including Aldous Huxley, George Orwell, Evelyn Waugh, Kingsley Amis, P. G. Wodehouse and Conor Cruise O'Brien. When asked what the difference between an autobiography and a memoir was, he replied “Look, everyone has a book inside of them ... which is exactly where I think it should, in most cases, remain”.

Professorships
Hitchens was a visiting professor in the following institutions:
 University of California, Berkeley
 The University of Pittsburgh
 The New School of Social Research

Relationship with his brother
Christopher's sibling was the journalist and author Peter Hitchens, who is two years younger. Christopher said in 2005 the main difference between the two is belief in the existence of God. Peter became a member of the International Socialists (forerunners of the modern Socialist Workers' Party) from 1968 to 1975 (beginning at age 17) after Christopher introduced him to them.

The brothers fell out after Peter wrote a 2001 article in The Spectator which allegedly characterised Christopher as a Stalinist. After the birth of Peter's third child, the brothers were reconciled. Peter's review of God Is Not Great led to a public argument between the brothers but no renewed estrangement.

In 2007 the brothers appeared as panellists on BBC TV's Question Time, where they clashed on a number of issues. In 2008, in the US, they debated the 2003 invasion of Iraq and the existence of God. In 2010 at the Pew Forum, the pair debated the nature of God in civilisation. At the memorial service held for Christopher in New York, Peter read a passage from St Paul's Epistle to the Philippians which Christopher himself had read at their father's funeral.

Political views

In 2009 Hitchens was listed by Forbes magazine as one of the "25 most influential liberals in the U.S. media". The article also noted that he would "likely be aghast to find himself on this list", as it reduces his self-styled radicalism to mere liberalism. Hitchens's political perspectives also appear in his wide-ranging writings, which include many dialogues. He said of Ayn Rand's Objectivism, "I have always found it quaint, and rather touching, that there is a movement in the US that thinks Americans are not yet selfish enough."

Hitchens struggled with the premise of a Jewish homeland and had said of himself, "I am an Anti-Zionist. I'm one of those people of Jewish descent who believes that Zionism would be a mistake even if there were no Palestinians."

Having long described himself as a socialist and a Marxist, Hitchens began his break from the established political left after what he called the "tepid reaction" of the Western left to the controversy over The Satanic Verses, followed by what he saw as the left's embrace of Bill Clinton and the anti-war movement's opposition to NATO intervention in Bosnia and Herzegovina in the 1990s. He later became a so-called liberal hawk and supported the War on Terror, but he had some reservations, such as his characterisation of waterboarding as torture after voluntarily undergoing the procedure. In January 2006, he joined four other individuals and four organisations, including the ACLU and Greenpeace, as plaintiffs in a lawsuit, ACLU v. NSA, challenging Bush's NSA warrantless surveillance; the lawsuit was filed with the ACLU.

Hitchens was an avid critic of President Slobodan Milošević of Serbia and other Serbian politicians of the 1990s. He called Milošević a "fascist" and a "nazi" after the Bosnian genocide and ethnic cleansing of Albanians in Kosovo and expressed a positive reaction to his death. Hitchens often accused the Serbian government of committing numerous war crimes during the Yugoslav Wars. He denounced people like Noam Chomsky and Edward S. Herman, who criticized the NATO intervention there. Hitchens also criticized Croatian president Franjo Tuđman and the policies of the Croatian government, which he saw as reviving "Ustashe formations".

Hitchens held complex views on abortion; being ethically opposed to it in most instances, and believing that a fetus was entitled to personhood, while holding ambiguous and changing views on its legality. In terms of abortion, Hitchens agreed that an unborn child was a human life. In a 1988 interview with Crisis Magazine, Hitchens wrote: "It might interest your readers to know that Margaret Thatcher voted to keep capital punishment, to keep homosexuality criminal, to make divorce harder to get, and for the abortion bill. I gather that she’s since changed her position on the latter. My own vote would have been, as so often, exactly the reverse of hers." However, Hitchens argued that the issue was cynically used by self-described pro-life politicians, and doubted that they sincerely desired to legally prohibit abortion.

In the same 1988 interview with Crisis Magazine he stated:Once you allow that the occupant of the womb is even potentially a life, it cuts athwart any glib invocation of “the woman’s right to choose"and that:I would like to see something much broader, much more visionary. We need a new compact between society and the woman. It’s a progressive compact because it is aimed at the future generation.  It would restrict abortion in most circumstances. Now I know most women don’t like having to justify their circumstances to someone. ‘How dare you presume to subject me to this?’ some will say.But sorry, lady, this is an extremely grave social issue. It’s everybody’s business.Hitchens supported gun rights and supported same-sex marriage.

Hitchens was a supporter of the European Union. In an appearance on C-SPAN in 1993, Hitchens said, "As of 1992, there is now a Euro passport that makes you free to travel within the boundaries of ... member countries, and I've always liked the idea of European unity, and so I held out for a Euro passport. So I travel as a European." Speaking at the launch of his brother Peter Hitchens's book, The Abolition of Britain, at Conway Hall in London, Hitchens denounced the so-called Eurosceptic movement, describing it as "the British version of fascism". He went on to say, "Scepticism is a title of honour. These people are not sceptical. They're fanatical. They're dogmatic".

Critiques of specific individuals
Hitchens wrote book-length biographical essays on Thomas Jefferson (Thomas Jefferson: Author of America), Thomas Paine (Thomas Paine's "Rights of Man": A Biography) and George Orwell (Why Orwell Matters).

He also became known for excoriating criticisms of public contemporary figures, including Mother Teresa, Bill Clinton and Henry Kissinger, the subjects of three full-length texts: The Missionary Position: Mother Teresa in Theory and Practice, No One Left to Lie To: The Triangulations of William Jefferson Clinton, and The Trial of Henry Kissinger respectively. In 2007, while promoting his book God Is Not Great: How Religion Poisons Everything, Hitchens described the Christian evangelist Billy Graham as "a self-conscious fraud" and "a disgustingly evil man". Hitchens claimed that the evangelist, who had recently been hospitalised for intestinal bleeding, made a living by "going around spouting lies to young people. What a horrible career. I gather it's soon to be over. I certainly hope so."

In response to the comments, writers Nancy Gibbs and Michael Duffy published an article in Time in which, among other things, they challenged Hitchens's suggestion that Graham went into ministry to make money. They argued that during his career Graham "turn[ed] down million-dollar television and Hollywood offers." They also pointed out that having established the Billy Graham Evangelistic Association in 1950, Graham drew a straight salary, comparable to that of a senior minister, irrespective of the money raised by his meetings.

In 1999, Hitchens wrote a profile of Donald Trump for The Sunday Herald. Trump had expressed interest in running in the 2000 U.S. Presidential Election as a candidate for the Reform Party. Of Trump, Hitchens said, "Because the man with many monikers in many ways embodies his country and because this election cycle is now so absurd, and so much up for grabs, it is unwise to exclude anything ... The best guess has to be that here's a man who hates to be alone, who needs approval and reinforcement, who talks a better game than he plays, who is crude, hyperactive, emotional and optimistic." Hitchens had previously written that Trump demonstrated how "nobody is more covetous and greedy than those who have far too much."

Criticism of religion

Hitchens was an antitheist, and said that a person "could be an atheist and wish that belief in God were correct", but that "an antitheist, a term I'm trying to get into circulation, is someone who is relieved that there's no evidence for such an assertion." He often spoke against the Abrahamic religions. When asked by readers of The Independent (London) what he considered to be the "axis of evil", Hitchens replied "Christianity, Judaism, Islam – the three leading monotheisms." In debates Hitchens often posed what has become known as "Hitchens's Challenge": to name at least one moral action that a person without a faith (e.g., an atheist or antitheist) could not possibly perform, and conversely, to name one immoral action that only a person with a faith could perform or has performed in the past.

In his best-seller God Is Not Great, Hitchens expanded his criticism to include all religions, including those rarely criticised by Western secularists, such as Buddhism and neo-paganism. Hitchens said that organised religion is "the main source of hatred in the world", calling it "violent, irrational, intolerant, allied to racism, tribalism, and bigotry, invested in ignorance and hostile to free inquiry, contemptuous of women and coercive toward children: [it] ought to have a great deal on its conscience". In the same work Hitchens says that humanity therefore needs a renewed Enlightenment. The book received mixed responses, ranging from praise in The New York Times for his "logical flourishes and conundrums" to accusations of "intellectual and moral shabbiness" in the Financial Times. God Is Not Great was nominated for a National Book Award on 10 October 2007.

God Is Not Great affirmed Hitchens's position in the "New Atheism" movement. Hitchens was made an Honorary Associate of the Rationalist International and the National Secular Society shortly after its release and he was later named to the Honorary Board of distinguished achievers of the Freedom From Religion Foundation. He also joined the advisory board of the Secular Coalition for America, a group of atheists and humanists. Hitchens said he would accept an invitation from any religious leader who wished to debate with him. On 30 September 2007, Richard Dawkins, Hitchens, Sam Harris, and Daniel Dennett met at Hitchens's residence for a private, unmoderated discussion lasting two hours. The event was videotaped and entitled "The Four Horsemen". In it, Hitchens stated at one point that he saw the Maccabean Revolt as the most unfortunate event in human history due to the reversion from Hellenistic thought and philosophy to messianism and fundamentalism that its success constituted.

That year Hitchens began a series of written debates on the question "Is Christianity Good for the World?" with Christian theologian and pastor Douglas Wilson, published in Christianity Today magazine. This exchange eventually became a book with the same title published in 2008. During their promotional tour of the book, they were accompanied by the producer Darren Doane's film crew. Thence Doane produced the film Collision: Is Christianity GOOD for the World?, which was released on 27 October 2009. On 4 April 2009, Hitchens debated William Lane Craig on the existence of God at Biola University. On 19 October 2009, Intelligence Squared explored the question "Is the Catholic Church a force for good in the world?". John Onaiyekan and Ann Widdecombe argued that it was, while Hitchens joined Stephen Fry in arguing that it was not. The latter side won the debate according to an audience poll. On 26 November 2010, Hitchens appeared in Toronto, Ontario, at the Munk Debates, where he debated religion with former British Prime Minister Tony Blair, a convert to Roman Catholicism. Blair argued religion is a force for good, while Hitchens argued against that.

Throughout these debates, Hitchens became known for his persuasive and enthusiastic rhetoric in public speaking. "Wit and eloquence", "verbal barbs and linguistic dexterity" and "self-reference, literary engagement and hyperbole" are all elements of his speeches. The term "hitch-slap" has been used as an informal term among his supporters for a carefully crafted remark designed to humiliate his opponents. Hitchens's line "one asks wistfully if there is no provision in the procedures of military justice for them to be taken out and shot," condemning the perpetrators of the Abu Ghraib torture and prisoner abuse, was cited by The Humanist as an example. A tribute in Politico stated that this was a trait Hitchens shared with fellow atheist and intellectual Gore Vidal.

Personal life

Hitchens was raised nominally Christian and attended Christian boarding schools, but from an early age he declined to participate in communal prayers. Later in life, Hitchens discovered that he was of Jewish descent on his mother's side and that his Jewish ancestors were immigrants from Eastern Europe (including Poland). Hitchens was married twice, first to Eleni Meleagrou, a Greek Cypriot, in 1981; the couple had a son Alexander and a daughter Sophia.

In 1991 Hitchens married his second wife, Carol Blue, an American screenwriter, in a ceremony held at the apartment of Victor Navasky, editor of The Nation. They had a daughter together, Antonia. 

Hitchens considered reading, writing and public speaking not as a job or career but as "what I am, who I am, [and] what I love."

In November 1973 Hitchens's mother committed suicide in Athens in a pact with her lover, a defrocked clergyman named Timothy Bryan. The pair overdosed on sleeping pills in adjoining hotel rooms and Bryan slashed his wrists in the bathtub. Hitchens flew alone to Athens to recover his mother's body, initially under the impression that she had been murdered.

In 2007, after living in the US for 25 years, he became an American citizen (while retaining his UK citizenship).

Illness and death

On June 8, 2010, Hitchens was on tour in New York promoting his memoirs Hitch-22 when he was taken into emergency care suffering from a severe pericardial effusion. Soon after, he announced he was postponing his tour to undergo treatment for oesophageal cancer.

In a Vanity Fair piece titled "Topic of Cancer," he stated that he was undergoing treatment for cancer. He said that he recognised the long-term prognosis was far from positive and he would be a "very lucky person to live another five years." A heavy smoker and drinker since his teenage years, Hitchens acknowledged that these habits were likely to have contributed to his illness. During his illness, Hitchens was under the care of Francis Collins and was the subject of Collins's new cancer treatment, which maps out the human genome and selectively targets damaged DNA.

According to Christopher Buckley, before Hitchens died, his estranged friend Sidney Blumenthal wrote to Hitchens. Buckley said the letter contained words of "tenderness and comfort and implicit forgiveness."

Hitchens died of pneumonia on 15 December 2011 in the University of Texas MD Anderson Cancer Center, Houston, aged 62. In accordance with his wishes, his body was donated to medical research. Mortality, a collection of seven of Hitchens's Vanity Fair essays about his illness, was published posthumously in September 2012.

Reactions to death

Former British prime minister Tony Blair said, "Christopher Hitchens was a complete one-off, an amazing mixture of writer, journalist, polemicist and unique character. He was fearless in the pursuit of truth and any cause in which he believed. And there was no belief he held that he did not advocate with passion, commitment and brilliance. He was an extraordinary, compelling and colourful human being whom it was a privilege to know."

Richard Dawkins said of Hitchens, "He was a polymath, a wit, immensely knowledgeable, and a valiant fighter against all tyrants, including imaginary supernatural ones." Dawkins later described Hitchens as "probably the best orator I've ever heard", and called his death "an enormous loss".
 American theoretical physicist and cosmologist Lawrence Krauss said, "Christopher was a beacon of knowledge and light in a world that constantly threatens to extinguish both. He had the courage to accept the world for just what it is and not what he wanted it to be. That's the highest praise, I believe, one can give to any intellect. He understood that the universe doesn't care about our existence or welfare, and he epitomized the realization that our lives have meaning only to the extent that we give them meaning." Bill Maher paid tribute to Hitchens on his show Real Time with Bill Maher, saying, "We lost a hero of mine, a friend, and one of the great talk show guests of all time." Salman Rushdie and English comedian Stephen Fry paid tribute at the Christopher Hitchens Vanity Fair Memorial 2012.

British Conservative and friend of Hitchens Douglas Murray paid tribute to Hitchens in an article in The Spectator, recalling personal experiences with him.

Three weeks before Hitchens's death, George Eaton of the New Statesman wrote, "He is determined to ensure that he is not remembered simply as a 'lefty who turned right' or as a contrarian and provocateur. Throughout his career, he has retained a commitment to the Enlightenment values of reason, secularism, and pluralism. His targets—Mother Teresa, Bill Clinton, Henry Kissinger, God—are chosen not at random, but rather because they have offended one or more of these principles. The tragedy of Hitchens's illness is that it came at a time when he enjoyed a larger audience than ever. The great polemicist is certain to be remembered, but, as he was increasingly aware, perhaps not as he would like." The Chronicle of Higher Education asked if Hitchens was the last public intellectual.

In 2015 an annual prize of $50,000 was established in his honour by The Dennis and Victoria Ross Foundation for "an author or journalist whose work reflects a commitment to free expression and inquiry, a range and depth of intellect, and a willingness to pursue the truth without regard to personal or professional consequence".

Film and television appearances

Books

 1984 Cyprus. Quartet. Revised editions as Hostage to History: Cyprus from the Ottomans to Kissinger, 1989 (Farrar, Straus & Giroux) and 1997 (Verso) 
 1987 Imperial Spoils: The Curious Case of the Elgin Marbles, Hill and Wang 
 1988 Blaming the Victims: Spurious Scholarship and the Palestinian Question (contributor; co-editor with Edward Said) Verso,  Reissued, 2001
 1988 Prepared for the Worst: Selected Essays and Minority Reports Hill and Wang, 
 1990 The Monarchy: A Critique of Britain's Favorite Fetish, Chatto & Windus Ltd 
 1990 Blood, Class and Nostalgia: Anglo-American Ironies, Farrar Straus & Giroux (T) 
 1993 "For the Sake of Argument" Verso 
 1995 The Missionary Position: Mother Teresa in Theory and Practice, Verso
 1997 The Parthenon Marbles: The Case for Reunification, Verso 
 1999 No One Left to Lie To: The Values of the Worst Family, original hardcover title: "No One Left to Lie To: The Triangulations of William Jefferson Clinton," Verso
 2000 Unacknowledged Legislation: Writers in the Public Sphere, Verso
 2001 The Trial of Henry Kissinger. Verso. 
 2001 Letters to a Young Contrarian, Basic Books
 2002 Why Orwell Matters also Orwell's Victory, Basic Books, 
 2003 A Long Short War: The Postponed Liberation of Iraq. Plume/Penguin Group, 
 2004 Love, Poverty, and War: Journeys and Essays, Thunder's Mouth, Nation Books, 
 2005 Thomas Jefferson: Author of America, Eminent Lives/Atlas Books/HarperCollins Publishers, 
 2007 "Thomas Paine's Rights of Man: A Biography ", Atlantic Monthly Press, 
 2007 God Is Not Great: How Religion Poisons Everything, Twelve/Hachette Book Group USA/Warner Books,  / Published in the UK as God is not Great: The Case Against Religion, Atlantic Books, 
 2007 The Portable Atheist: Essential Readings for the Non-Believer, [Editor] Perseus Publishing. 
 2008 Christopher Hitchens and His Critics: Terror, Iraq and the Left (with Simon Cottee and Thomas Cushman), New York University Press, 
 2008 Is Christianity Good for the World? – A Debate (co-author, with Douglas Wilson), Canon Press, 
 2010 Hitch-22: A Memoir, Twelve,  
 2011 Arguably: Essays by Christopher Hitchens, Twelve. UK edition as Arguably: Selected Prose, Atlantic, 
 2012 Mortality, Twelve, . UK edition as Mortality, Atlantic Books, 
 2015 And Yet...: Essays, Simon & Schuster,

References

External links

 2010 archive of official website
 Contributor page at Vanity Fair
 Columnist at Slate
 Column archive at The Atlantic
 Article archive at The Guardian
 
 
 
 

Christopher Hitchens
1949 births
2011 deaths
20th-century atheists
20th-century English non-fiction writers
20th-century English philosophers
20th-century essayists
21st-century American philosophers
21st-century atheists
21st-century British non-fiction writers
21st-century English philosophers
21st-century essayists
21st-century American memoirists
21st-century English memoirists
Alumni of Balliol College, Oxford
American anti-capitalists
American anti-fascists
American autobiographers
American democratic socialists
American foreign policy writers
American humanists
American male essayists
American male non-fiction writers
American media critics
American non-fiction writers
American skeptics
American secularists
American social commentators
Anti-monarchists
Anti–Vietnam War activists
Atheist philosophers
Bisexual men
American bisexual writers
British bisexual writers
British emigrants to the United States
British foreign policy writers
British male essayists
British media critics
British people of Polish-Jewish descent
British secularists
British social commentators
Christ myth theory proponents
Contestants on University Challenge
Conversationalists
Critics of alternative medicine
Critics of the Catholic Church
Critics of creationism
Critics of multiculturalism
Critics of new religious movements
Critics of Objectivism (Ayn Rand)
Critics of postmodernism
Critics of religions
Deaths from cancer in Texas
Deaths from esophageal cancer
English anti-fascists
English atheist writers
English autobiographers
English communists
English essayists
English humanists
English literary critics
English male journalists
English male non-fiction writers
English Marxists
English non-fiction writers
English political commentators
English political philosophers
English political writers
English republicans
English sceptics
European democratic socialists
Genital integrity activists
Labour Party (UK) people
English LGBT rights activists
American LGBT rights activists
Male essayists
Materialists
New Statesman people
British opinion journalists
New Atheism
PEN/Diamonstein-Spielvogel Award winners
People educated at The Leys School
Writers from Portsmouth
People with acquired American citizenship
Philosophers of culture
Philosophers of literature
Philosophers of religion
Philosophers of social science
Philosophers of war
Political philosophers
Secular humanists
Slate (magazine) people
Social philosophers
Socialist Workers Party (UK) members
The Atlantic (magazine) people
The Nation (U.S. magazine) people
Theorists on Western civilization
Vanity Fair (magazine) people
Writers about activism and social change
Writers about globalization
Writers about religion and science
Writers from Washington, D.C.
People educated at Mount House School, Tavistock